The list of people from West Yorkshire, in northern England, is divided by metropolitan borough. West Yorkshire is a metropolitan county created in 1974 and so people from the area before this year were from the earlier West Riding of Yorkshire.

 
West Yorkshire
People
Yorkshire, West